The 1964–65 Montenegrin Republic League was 20th season of Montenegrin Republic League. Season started in August 1964 and finished in May 1965.

Season 

Except the teams from previous year, a new member of the competition was Arsenal. They replaced a last placed team from previous season (Zeta).
At the end of 18 weeks long competition, Lovćen won the title, with 31 from 36 possible points. With that result, Lovćen participated in the qualifiers for Yugoslav Second League.
Last-placed Gorštak was relegated.

Table

Qualifiers for Yugoslav Second League 
Lovćen played in the qualifiers for 1965-66 Second League - East. They won a qualifiers against champion of Republic League of SR Macedonia - Teteks Tetovo, and get promotion to higher level.

Higher leagues 
On season 1964–65, two Montenegrin teams played in higher leagues of SFR Yugoslavia. Sutjeska participated in 1964–65 Yugoslav First League, while Budućnost played in 1964–65 Yugoslav Second League.

See also 
 Montenegrin Republic League
 Montenegrin Republic Cup (1947–2006)
 Montenegrin clubs in Yugoslav football competitions (1946–2006)
 Montenegrin Football Championship (1922–1940)

References 

Montenegrin Republic League